Lenhart Farm is a historic house and farm complex located in Lenhartsville, Berks County, Pennsylvania.  The house was built by about 1830, and is a 2 1/2-story, five bay, brownstone dwelling in the Georgian style. Also on the property are a stone and frame bank barn (1841), springhouse, carriage house, and a number of farm-related outbuildings.

It was listed on the National Register of Historic Places in 1978.

References

Farms on the National Register of Historic Places in Pennsylvania
Georgian architecture in Pennsylvania
Houses completed in 1830
Houses in Berks County, Pennsylvania
1830 establishments in Pennsylvania
National Register of Historic Places in Berks County, Pennsylvania